Southwestern Senior High School was a public high school located in Baltimore, Maryland. The school opened in September 1971 and closed in June 2007. The building was vacant for a year before the city leased it to the SEED School of Maryland boarding school. The main classroom building was torn down along with the library and cafeteria. The building has been replaced with dorms and portable classrooms.

Notable student: Ken “The Animal” Bannister”
Ken played in the NBA for five seasons (from 1985 through 1991), two with the New York Knicks and three with the L.A. Clippers. He also played professionally in Israel. (See the website  <basketball-reference.com>

Notable staff and students
Jack L. Chalker, novelist, taught at this school until 1978, when he left to write full-time
Ruff Endz band members David Chance and Dante Jordan
Ben Carson, neurosurgeon and politician

Public schools in Baltimore
Defunct schools in Maryland
1971 establishments in Maryland
2007 disestablishments in Maryland